Niels Oude Kamphuis (born 14 November 1977) is a retired Dutch footballer. He is best remembered for his time at Schalke 04. He operated mostly as a defensive midfielder.

Oude Kamphuis was originally a midfielder, but could also double up as a defender. He started his career at FC Twente, where he spent five years, before leaving for German side, FC Schalke 04. After Schalke, Oude Kamphuis joined Borussia Mönchengladbach, another German-based side. He ended his playing football career at FC Twente, because of long term injuries.

Club career

FC Twente
Oude Kamphuis was born in Hengelo. As a teenager, he joined FC Twente, the Dutch club to which he would return twelve years later. At Twente, he earned 126 caps over the course of the five seasons he was there. In that time, he scored seven goals from defence.

Schalke 04
Oude Kamphuis spent his first season with German Bundesliga team, FC Schalke 04, during their 1999–2000 campaign. With the Gelsenkirchen club, he earned over 120 appearances, securing eight goals over the course of, again, five years.

Borussia Mönchengladbach
On 30 May 2005, Niels joined fellow Bundesliga side, Borussia Mönchengladbach. He signed on a free transfer with the club. Niels' transfer was met with excitement at Borussia Mönchengladbach, especially within the board. Director of sport, Peter Pander said that Mönchengladbach had "a strong, versatile and internationally-experienced player". He added "I am sure we will be stronger with him."

Return to Twente
After requesting that, for family reasons, he return to his native Netherlands, Borussia Mönchengladbach allowed the Dutchman permanent leave. Oude Kamphuis then re-signed for Twente on 16 August 2006, having spent five years as a youth there. The rules of football stated that Twente were not required to pay a fee for Niels, as he was a free agent.

International career
He played once for the Netherlands national football team in a friendly against England in 2001.

Honours
Schalke 04
UEFA Intertoto Cup: 2004

References

External links
 Profile at VI.nl

1977 births
Living people
Sportspeople from Hengelo
Dutch footballers
Dutch expatriate footballers
Netherlands international footballers
Netherlands under-21 international footballers
FC Twente players
FC Schalke 04 players
Borussia Mönchengladbach players
Bundesliga players
Eredivisie players
Expatriate footballers in Germany
Association football midfielders
Footballers from Overijssel
Dutch expatriate sportspeople in Germany